Malek-e Ashtar (also Romanized as Mālek-e Ashtar; also known as Bahādor Bayk, Bahādor Beyg, and Bahādūr Beg) is a village in Salehabad Rural District, Salehabad District, Bahar County, Hamadan Province, Iran. At the 2006 census, its population was 2,918, in 673 families.

References 

Populated places in Bahar County